Sana Mir (born 5 January 1986) is a Pakistani cricket commentator and former cricketer who served as a captain of the Pakistan national women's cricket team in ODIs and T20Is. She played in 226 international matches, including 137 of those as captain of the side.  She was the first bowler for Pakistan to take 100 wickets in WODIs. She played domestic cricket for Karachi and Zarai Taraqiati Bank Limited.

In October 2018, she became the first Pakistani women cricketer to rank number 1 in ICC ODI bowler ranking. She has led Pakistan to two Gold medals in Asian Games 2010 and 2014. She was announced Player of the Tournament at the 2008 Women's Cricket World Cup Qualifier, and currently ranks 1st in the Women's ODI Bowlers in the ICC Player Rankings. She has been in Top 20 ICC rankings for last 9 years. During her Captaincy 8 players from Pakistan have made their way into the top 20 ICC rankings.

In February 2017, during the 2017 Women's Cricket World Cup Qualifier, she became the first Pakistan woman to take 100 wickets in WODIs. In September 2017, Bismah Maroof was made captain of Pakistan women's ODI team, after Mir stepped down from the role. In February 2019, she became the first woman for Pakistan to play in 100 Women's Twenty20 International matches. In November 2019, she announced that she would be taking a break from international cricket. On 25 April 2020, she announced her retirement from international cricket. In May 2022, Mir temporarily came out of retirement to captain South Coast Sapphires in the 2022 FairBreak Invitational T20.

Early life 
Sana was born in Abbotabad, into a military family from Rawalpindi. Her father, Mir Moatazid, was a colonel in Pakistan Army and during her father's service she lived in different cantonments. She received her early education from Rawalpindi and then studied briefly during her stay in Gujranwala Cantonment. She completed her matriculation in HITEC HEAVY INDUSTRIES TAXILA EDUCATION CITY Taxila Cantonment. Later, her family moved to Karachi where she completed her intermediate and bachelor's degrees.

After completion of intermediate, she was admitted to the National University of Sciences & Technology (NUST), but could not complete the engineering degree due to her focus on cricket.

International career

Captaincy
On 4 May 2009, Mir was handed the Pakistan captaincy for the Women's World Twenty20. Mir retained the captaincy for the forthcoming 2010 ICC Women's Cricket Challenge in South Africa.

2010
At the 2010 Asian Games, Mir led the team to a gold medal.

2011
By Winning the National Championship for the fourth time in a row, Mir became the most successful captain of Pakistan at domestic level. Her team has yet to lose a game at domestic level in the past four years.

Mir also led the Pakistan team to their first ever tournament win in both the T20 and ODI formats when they played in Sri Lanka in 2011. The teams in the quadrangular cup were Sri Lanka, Pakistan, Ireland, and the Netherlands. She was also awarded the Player of the Match title in the T20 quadrangular-cup final against the Netherlands.

World Cup Qualifiers 2012:
The women's team has qualified for the 2012 T20 and 2013 Women's ODI world cup under her captaincy.
For the first time ever, the team also beat South Africa, thereby, improving their world ranking from 8 to 6.

2012
At Domestic cricket, the ZTBL team has won the first ever BB tournament and 7th National championship under her Captaincy. This makes it 5 in a, Mir has become the first ever female cricketer from Pakistan to be awarded Tamgha-e-Imtiaz on 23 March 2012, for her services in cricket.

2013
At Domestic cricket, the ZTBL team has won the second BB tournament and 8th National championship under her Captaincy. This makes it 6 in a row. Mir became the first woman cricketer to receive PCB Woman cricketer of the Year Award 2013. 

Pakistan women team showed their best performance on a European tour in 2013. The team has beaten England for the first time in any format and levelled the t20 series. The team has won 11 matches in a row. After the completion of this tour Pakistan women's team has 6 members in ICC top 20 players ranking.

2014 
She played in Pakistan's gold-medal winning team in the 2014 Asian Games.

2018

In October 2018, she was named in Pakistan's squad for the 2018 ICC Women's World Twenty20 tournament in the West Indies.

References

External links
 
 

1986 births
Living people
Cricketers from Abbottabad
Pakistani people of Kashmiri descent
Pakistani women cricketers
Pakistan women One Day International cricketers
Pakistan women Twenty20 International cricketers
Pakistani women cricket captains
Women's Twenty20 International cricket hat-trick takers
Karachi women cricketers
Zarai Taraqiati Bank Limited women cricketers
Pakistani cricket commentators
Women cricket commentators
Asia Game Changer Award winners
Asian Games gold medalists for Pakistan
Asian Games medalists in cricket
Cricketers at the 2010 Asian Games
Cricketers at the 2014 Asian Games
Medalists at the 2010 Asian Games
Medalists at the 2014 Asian Games